Guardamiglio is a comune (municipality) in the Province of Lodi in the Italian region Lombardy, located about  southeast of Milan, about  southeast of Lodi, and  north of Piacenza.
  
Guardamiglio borders the following municipalities: Somaglia, Fombio, Calendasco, San Rocco al Porto.

References

External links
 Official website

Cities and towns in Lombardy